Princess Elisabeth of Thurn and Taxis may refer to:

 Princess Elisabeth of Thurn and Taxis (1860–1881), daughter of Maximilian Anton Lamoral, Hereditary Prince of Thurn and Taxis, wife of Miguel, Duke of Braganza
 Princess Elisabeth of Thurn and Taxis (1901–1950), daughter of William IV, Grand Duke of Luxembourg, wife of Prince Ludwig Philipp of Thurn and Taxis
 Princess Elisabeth Helene of Thurn and Taxis (1903–1976), daughter of Albert, 8th Prince of Thurn and Taxis, wife of Friedrich Christian, Margrave of Meissen
 Princess Elisabeth von Thurn und Taxis (b. 1982), daughter of Johannes, 11th Prince of Thurn and Taxis and Countess Gloria of Schönburg in Glauchau and Waldenburg